was Grand Steward of the Imperial Household Office (now the Imperial Household Agency) (1947–1948). He was a graduate of the University of Oxford.

Family
Father:Matsudaira Yoshinaga
Adoptive father: Yasutaka Matsudaira
Adoptive father-in-law:Katsunosuke Inoue
Son:Nagayoshi Matsudaira
Cousins:Tokugawa Iesato and Tokugawa Satotaka

References

Bibliography
 霞会館華族家系大成編輯委員会『平成新修旧華族家系大成』（霞会館、1996年）

1882 births
1948 deaths
Alumni of the University of Oxford
Fukui-Matsudaira clan